R376 road may refer to:
 R376 road (Ireland)
 R376 road (South Africa)